The Very Best of Asia: Heat of the Moment (1982–1990) is a greatest hits compilation album by the British band Asia, released in 2000. Covering the 1982–1990 period, it features songs from the band's first three albums, Asia, Alpha and Astra, plus three rare single B-sides ("Daylight", "Lying to Yourself", and "Ride Easy"), which had also been included on the Japan-exclusive EP Aurora in 1986, and one song from the Then & Now half compilation/half studio album released in 1989, "Days Like These".

The tracks "Sole Survivor" and "Here Comes the Feeling" are presented in their edited single versions. "Days Like These" features Toto guitarist Steve Lukather.

Track listing

Personnel
Geoff Downes - keyboards, backing vocals
Steve Howe - guitars, backing vocals
John Wetton - bass, lead vocals, keyboards
Carl Palmer - drums
with :
Mandy Meyer - Guitar [tracks: 14-16]
Steve Lukather - Guitar [track: 17]

References

Asia (band) albums
2000 greatest hits albums
Progressive rock compilation albums